Jan Kotík (4 January 1916 in Turnov, Austria-Hungary – 23 March 2002 in Berlin, Germany) was a Czech artist active from the 1940s.

Kotik was a member of Skupina 42 during World War II. Following the war his art was influenced by Chinese calligraphy. In 1956 he attended the Congress of Alba and signed up to the Final Resolution of the Alba Congress. 

His son is the musician Petr Kotík and his grandson was Jan Jakub Kotík.

References

External links
 Artist profile and collection of works at Mutual Art
 Kotik profile at Jiri Svestka gallery

1916 births
2002 deaths
Czech artists
Group 42
People from Turnov
Czechoslovak artists